The 2013–14 Tennessee–Martin Skyhawks men's basketball team represented the University of Tennessee at Martin during the 2013–14 NCAA Division I men's basketball season. The Skyhawks, led by fifth year head coach Jason James, played their home games at Skyhawk Arena and were members of the West Division of the Ohio Valley Conference. They finished the season 8–23, 3–13 in OVC play to finish in last place in the West Division. They failed to qualify for the Ohio Valley Tournament.

Head coach Jason James was fired at the end of the season. He had a record of 37–117 in five seasons.

Previous season 
The Skyhawks finished the 2012–13 season 9–21, 5–11 in OVC play to finish in a tie for fourth place in the West Division. They lost in the first round of the OVC tournament to Morehead State.

Roster

Schedule

|-
!colspan=9 style=| Regular season

References

UT Martin Skyhawks men's basketball seasons
Tennessee-Martin